Brett O. Feese (born May 21, 1954) is a former Republican member of the Pennsylvania House of Representatives.

He is a 1972 graduate of Montoursville High School. He earned a degree from Indiana University of Pennsylvania in 1976 and a J.D. from the Dickinson School of Law in 1979.

He served as District Attorney of Lycoming County, Pennsylvania. He was first elected to represent the 84th legislative district in 1994. Feese retired prior to the 2006 Pennsylvania House of Representatives election.

He was considered a possible Republican successor for Don Sherwood's congressional seat, should Sherwood retire.

Indictment
Brett O. Feese was the Republican House Caucus legal counsel immediately prior to his indictment for his role in Computergate by the Pennsylvania Statewide Investigative Grand Jury.
On November 8, 2011, Feese was found guilty by a Dauphin County jury on all 40 counts.  (11-9-11 Williamsport Sun-Gazette, p. A-1 and A-5).

Along with John Perzel, and several others, Republican PA House Caucus legal counsel Feese was indicted on November 12, 2009, on 62 counts of participating in the 2006 Pennsylvania General Assembly bonus controversy also known as Computergate, a scheme that used state funds for private political campaigning.<Pittsburgh Post-Gazette reference>

On February 10, 2012, Dauphin County judge Richard Lewis sentenced Republican House Caucus legal counsel  Feese to 4 to 12 years in state prison, an additional 2 years of probation, a $25,000.00 fine, and $1,000,000.00 in restitution for his role in the corruption scandal.  Feese remained free on bail and was ordered to report to prison on February 28, 2012 to begin serving his state prison sentence if denied appeal bail by the appellate courts.  (2-11-12 Williamsport Sun-Gazette, p. A-1 and A-5).

Feese surrendered his law license in November 2014 to the Pa. Lawyer Disciplinary Board almost 3 years after he had been sentenced to state prison.

Brett O. Feese is tentatively scheduled to be released on parole from SCI-Waymart on Sunday June 26, 2015.

References

External links
 official PA House profile

Living people
Republican Party members of the Pennsylvania House of Representatives
County district attorneys in Pennsylvania
1954 births
Pennsylvania politicians convicted of crimes